Montserrat competed at the 2022 Commonwealth Games in Birmingham, England from 28 July to 8 August 2022. This was Montserrat's 8th appearance at the Commonwealth Games after making its debut in 1994.

Montserrat's team consisted of five men competing in the sport of athletics (track and field).

Julius Morris served as the territory's flagbearer during the opening ceremony.

Competitors
The following is the list of number of competitors participating at the Games per sport/discipline.

Athletics

Montserrat's track and field consisted of five men, competing in the sprint events. 

Men
Track and road events

References

External links
Birmingham 2022 Commonwealth Games Official site

Nations at the 2022 Commonwealth Games
Montserrat at the Commonwealth Games
2022 in Montserrat